The Al Habtoor Women's 25K is a tournament for professional female tennis players, played on outdoor hard courts. The event is classified as a $25,000+H ITF Women's Circuit tournament and its first event will be held in Dubai, United Arab Emirates between 29 March 2021 and 4 April 2021.

Player 
Eighty plus players from around the world with International WTA ranking will participate in first edition of tournament.

References

External links 
 Official website
 ITF search

Hard court tennis tournaments
Tennis tournaments in the United Arab Emirates
Women's tennis tournaments